The Border Guard Police (abbreviated BGP) are a department of Myanmar's Myanmar Police Force, they're paramilitary police (border guard) specialising in border control, counterinsurgency, crowd control and security checkpoints in border areas and insurgent areas, gathering intelligence in local areas to counterinsurgency and counter perpetrators in border areas, internal security, law enforcement in border areas and insurgency areas, and protecting agency assets in risky areas. The BGP operate in northern Rakhine State and are especially active along the Bangladesh–Myanmar border, due to the ongoing exodus of Rohingya people fleeing sectarian violence in Myanmar. In addition to border security, the BGP are also responsible for manning checkpoints and documenting the movement of Rohingyas within Rakhine State.

Insurgents of the Arakan Rohingya Salvation Army have repeatedly attacked BGP posts along the Bangladesh–Myanmar border in revenge for the BGP's mistreatment of the Rohingya.

References 

Paramilitary organisations based in Myanmar
Law enforcement in Myanmar
Military of Myanmar